The 2015–16 Bonaire League season or known locally as the 2015–16 Kampionato was the 47th season of the Bonaire League. The regular season began on 13 September 2015 and concluded on 30 April 2016. The Buelta di 6 began on 4 May 2016 and will end on 8 June 2016. The dates of the Beulta di 4 and the Bonaire League final have not been identified.

Table

Regular season 

Only a handful of matches from the regular season have been known, but it is known that Atlétiko Flamingo, Vespo, Juventus, Real Rincon, Uruguay and Vitesse all qualified for the Buelta di 6.

Buelta di 6

Buelta di 4

Grand Final

See also 
 2015 Kopa MCB

References 

Bonaire League seasons
Bonaire
football
football